Die Insel: das Magazin der Ehelosen und Einsamen (The Island: The Magazine of the Celibate and Lonely) was a homosexual-oriented magazine published by Friedrich Radszuweit between September 1926 and March 1933. It was the literary supplement of the Blätter für Menschenrecht (Journal for Human Rights). At its height, it claimed a circulation of 150,000.

References

Defunct magazines published in Germany
1926 establishments in Germany
1933 disestablishments in Germany
LGBT-related magazines published in Germany
1930s LGBT-related mass media
1920s LGBT-related mass media
First homosexual movement